Happy Face Murders is a 1999 American made-for-television crime drama film directed by Brian Trenchard-Smith. It is based on a real story.

It was shot in 21 days and is one of director Brian Trenchard-Smith's favourite films.

Plot synopsis
Lorraine Petrovich (Ann-Margret) frames her abusive lover killing a young intellectually disabled girl by creating details of the murder from clues she picks up from Detective Jennifer Powell (Marg Helgenberger). Powell works the case with law doctoral student Dylan McCarthy (Henry Thomas), whom she repeatedly calls "Doc", despite McCarthy not actually being a doctor yet. After implicating herself, resulting in her jail sentence, she then recants her testimony but no one believes her, until clues surface from the real killer, who leaves messages that he is still out there, has killed before, and will kill again, signing his victims with Happy Faces.

Cast
Ann-Margret as Lorraine Petrovich
Marg Helgenberger as Jennifer Powell
Henry Thomas as Dylan McCarthy
Nicholas Campbell as Rusty Zuvic
Rick Peters as Billy Lee Peterson
David McIlwraith as Alan Sanford
Bruce Gray as Ephraim Quince
J. C. Mackenzie as Ed Baker
Emily Hampshire as Tracy Billings
Christina Collins as Nancy Severn
Sean Dick as Charlie Severn
Lynne Deragon as Virginia Billings
Anthony J. Mifsud as Gary Martin (uncredited)

Reception
David Nusair of Reel Film Reviews gave a positive review on Marg Helgenberger's performance, writing she "provides enough charm to make it worth a look."

References

External links

Review at Variety
Review at Los Angeles Times

1999 television films
1999 films
1999 crime drama films
American crime drama films
Films directed by Brian Trenchard-Smith
Showtime (TV network) films
Paramount Pictures films
American drama television films
1990s English-language films
1990s American films